Dylan Talero (born 20 February 2004) is a Colombian footballer who plays as a forward for USL League One club Fort Lauderdale CF as a member of the Inter Miami academy. He is currently a player for Botafogo U20.

Career

Fort Lauderdale CF
Talero made his league debut for the club on 8 August 2020, coming on as an 87th-minute substitute for Sami Guediri in a 2-1 away victory over Tormenta FC.

References

External links
Dylan Talero at US Soccer Development Academy

2004 births
Living people
Colombian footballers
Association football forwards
Inter Miami CF II players
USL League One players
Colombian expatriate footballers
Expatriate soccer players in the United States
Colombian expatriate sportspeople in the United States